George A. Cardenas (born October 9, 1964) was Alderman of the 12th Ward of the City of Chicago. A member of the Democratic Party, he was elected to his first term on the Chicago City Council in 2003. He was elected commissioner of the 1st district of the Cook County Board of Review in the 2022 election, and subsequently resigned from the City Council.

Early life 
Cardenas was born in Santiago Papasquiaro, Durango, in the mountains of northern Mexico. Cardenas and his family moved to Chicago in 1978 where he attended Lane Tech High School. After graduation, he joined the United States Navy for four years. He earned his bachelor's degree from Northeastern Illinois University and went on to work as an auditor and a substitute teacher in public schools. Cardenas later became a tax and business consultant and went back to school to earn his master's degree in political science from Northeastern Illinois University.

Election 
Cardenas first ran for alderman in 2003. Cardenas was supported by the powerful Hispanic Democratic Organization, a group with strong ties to Chicago Mayor Richard M. Daley. In a 3-way race in February 2003, Cardenas and incumbent Alderman Ray Frias were the top two vote-getters, but neither earned a majority, forcing a run-off election scheduled for April 2003. Frias withdrew his candidacy prior to the run-off, cancelling the run-off, and leaving Cardenas as the winner.

Aldermanic career 
Cardenas has won reelection in 2007, 2011, 2015, and 2019. Cardenas currently serves as the City Council Deputy Floor Leader and Chair of the Committee on Environmental Protection and Energy. He is also a member of eight committees: Committees, Rules & Ethics; Finance, Budget, Contracting Oversight and Equity, Economic Capital and Technology Development, Immigrant and Refugee Rights, License and Consumer Protection and Pedestrian and Traffic Safety.

In 2006, Cardenas lost to Ald. Ricardo Muñoz in the race for state central committeeman for Illinois' 4th Congressional District, a Democratic Party post.

In the runoff of the 2019 Chicago mayoral election, Cardenas endorsed Lori Lightfoot.

Cardenas served as a delegate to the 2012 Democratic National Convention.

Cook County Board of Review
He was elected commissioner of the 1st district of the Cook County Board of Review in the 2022 election, and subsequently resigned from the City Council to assume his seat.

Professional career 
Before joining government, Cardenas accumulated over a decade of experience working for Fortune 500 companies, including Centel Corporation, McDonald's Corporation, Andersen Worldwide, Tenneco Corporation, Ameritech/SBC Corporation.

Personal life 
Cardenas lives with his wife and three daughters in McKinley Park.

Electoral history

Cook County Board of Commissioners

Democratic state committeeman

References

External links 
 Ald. Cardenas' Web site

1964 births
21st-century American politicians
American politicians of Mexican descent
Chicago City Council members
Illinois Democrats
Living people
Northeastern Illinois University alumni
Mexican-American people in Illinois politics